Sphaerodactylus pimienta, also known as the pepper sphaero, Cuban pepper sphaero, or Cuban pepper geckolet, is a species of gecko. It is endemic to Cuba.

References

Sphaerodactylus
Lizards of the Caribbean
Reptiles of Cuba
Endemic fauna of Cuba
Reptiles described in 1998
Taxa named by Orlando H. Garrido
Taxa named by Stephen Blair Hedges
Taxa named by Richard Thomas (herpetologist)